Aokas (Berber language: Aweqqas) is a coastal city and district in the Béjaïa Province in northern Algeria and is located at about 25 kilometres from the province's capital city of Bgayet. The commune of Aokas was created by decree of October 2, 1869. It covered an area of 2,202 hectares and had a population of 2,245 inhabitants in 1931. Its name in berber means shark. Its average altitude is 300 meters.

The population of Aokas (Aweqqas) was of 15 989 in 2008.

Geography
Aokas, means shark in berber, is located in the wilaya of Béjaïa, in coastal Kabylia

Hamlets 
Apart from the main locality of the commune, the hamlets of Aït Aïssa, Akkar, Mesbah, Tizi Djarmana, Aliouene ou Iaamrounene, Ansa, Tabellout, Tikherroubine, Amerzague, Tala Khaled, Laazib, Tidelsine, Iourarène, Tala Khelifa, Aguemoune, Tarmant I, Tarmant II and El Anseur are located in its confines.

Borders 

North      -> Mediterranean Sea
North-East -> Mediterranean Sea
East       -> Souk El Ténine
South-East -> Souk El Ténine and Taskriout
South      -> Taskriout
South-West -> Taskriout and Tizi N'Berber
West       -> Tizi N'Berber
North-West -> Tichy

Cityscape

References

Communes of Béjaïa Province